Chris Brightwell is a New Zealand-born rugby union player currently playing for England Sevens. Brightwell appeared for Hawkes Bay, Poneke Premiers and Wellington Development in his home country before moving to Birmingham and Solihull in 2008.

He then signed for Bedford Blues in 2009, before completing a transfer to Premiership side Sale Sharks. During his time at Birmingham and Solihull and Bedford Blues he also competed for England in the IRB World Sevens Series.

Chris was released from Sale at the end of the 2010–2011 season, however was recalled by Ben Ryan to the national sevens side to compete in the inaugural European Sevens Grand Prix during the summer of 2011. In August 2011 he re-signed for Birmingham and Solihull.  In June 2013 he joined Moseley.

It was announced on 26 April 2016 by the club that Chris would remain as Captain of Birmingham Moseley Rugby Club for their 2016/17 campaign in National League 1 along with Director of Rugby Kevin Maggs.

References

1984 births
Living people
New Zealand rugby union players
Moseley Rugby Football Club players
Rugby union players from Lower Hutt
Rugby union number eights